Yves Lessard (born January 2, 1943) is a Canadian politician. From 2001 to 2004, Lessard served as a city councillor in Saint-Basile-le-Grand, Quebec. In the 2004 Canadian federal election he was elected into the House of Commons of Canada as the Bloc Québécois candidate in Chambly—Borduas.

Born in Saint-Blaise-de-Barville, Quebec, a businessman and union adviser, Lessard was the Bloc critic of Human Resources and Skills Development.

He was defeated in the 2011 election by Matthew Dubé of the New Democratic Party.

References

1943 births
Living people
Bloc Québécois MPs
Members of the House of Commons of Canada from Quebec
21st-century Canadian politicians